Olga Hadžić (25 August 1946 – 23 January 2019) was a Serbian mathematician known for her work on fixed-point theorems.

Early life and education
Hadžić was born in Novi Sad, on 25 August 1946, the daughter of lawyer Lazar Hadžić and the granddaughter of writer and physician . She attended both the Gymnasium Jovan Jovanović Zmaj and a music school in Novi Sad. She earned a degree in mathematics at the University of Novi Sad in 1968, and continued there as an assistant, earning a master's degree through the Faculty of Natural Sciences And Mathematics at the University of Belgrade in 1970, and completing a doctorate at the University of Novi Sad in 1972. Her doctoral dissertation, Neki problemi diferencijalnog računa u lokalno konveksnim prostorima [Some problems of differential calculus in locally convex spaces], was supervised by Bogoljub Stanković.

Later in life, she took up the study of tourism management and marketing, earning a master's degree in 2005 from the University of Novi Sad and a second doctorate in 2006, supervised by Jovan Romelić.

Career and later life
Hadžić spent her career at the University of Novi Sad, becoming an assistant professor there in 1973, associate professor in 1977, and full professor in 1981. She became rector of the university in 1996, the first woman in Serbia to achieve this position.

She was the founding editor-in-chief of the mathematics journal Univerzitet u Novom Sadu, Zbornik Radova Prirodno-Matematičkog Fakulteta, Serija za Matemati [University of Novi Sad, Review of Research, Faculty of Science, Mathematics Series], which later became the Novi Sad Journal of Mathematics, from 1971 to 1995.

Books
Hadžić was the author of several books on mathematics, particularly focusing on fixed-point theorems, including:
Osnovi teorije nepokretne tačke [Foundations of fixed point theory], Institute of Matematics, Novi Sad, 1978.
Fixed point theory in topological vector spaces, Institute of Matematics, Novi Sad, 1984.
Numeričke i statističke metode u obradi eksperimentalnih podataka [Numerical and statistical methods in processing experimental data], Institute of Matematics, Novi Sad, 1989.
Fixed point theory in probabilistic metric spaces, Institute of Mathematics, Novi Sad, 1995.
Fixed point theory in probabilistic metric spaces, with Endre Pap, Kluwer, 2001.

Recognition
Hadžić was a member of the Serbian Academy of Sciences and Arts, elected in 1991, and also a member of the Vojvodina Academy of Sciences and Arts, elected as a corresponding member in 1984 and a regular member in 1990.

References

External links

1946 births
2019 deaths
Serbian mathematicians
Women mathematicians
University of Novi Sad alumni
Academic staff of the University of Novi Sad
Scientists from Novi Sad
Members of the Serbian Academy of Sciences and Arts